Saint-Leu-la-Forêt is a commune in the Val-d'Oise department, in the northwestern suburbs of Paris, France.

History
In 1806, the commune of Saint-Leu-la-Forêt merged with the neighboring commune of Taverny, resulting in the creation of the commune of Saint-Leu-Taverny.

In 1821, the commune of Saint-Leu-Taverny was demerged. Thus, Saint-Leu-la-Forêt and Taverny were both restored as separate communes.

Population

Transport
Saint-Leu-la-Forêt is served by Saint-Leu-la-Forêt station on the Transilien Paris-Nord suburban rail line.

Cultural connections
 Louis Bonaparte brother to Napoleon I and father to Napoleon III, is buried at Saint-Leu-la-Forêt.
 Wanda Landowska's villa in Saint-Leu-la-Forêt became a center for the performance and study of early music, particularly of the Baroque era.
 Eyvind Johnson lived rue de Boissy, from  1926 to 1930.
 Sylvie Oussenko (born in 1945), singer mezzo-soprano and writer was born in Saint-Leu-la-Forêt.
 In Patrick Modiano's book, So You Don't Get Lost in the Neighborhood, the narrator spends part of his childhood in the care of a teenage girl living in a mysterious house in Saint-Leu-la-Forêt.

Twin towns
 Wendlingen am Neckar, Germany
 Culcheth, United Kingdom

See also
Communes of the Val-d'Oise department

References

External links

Official website 
Association of Mayors of the Val d'Oise 

Communes of Val-d'Oise